Jerald William "Jerry" Blemker (October 2, 1944 – May 30, 2012) is a former coach of the Vincennes University baseball team. He finished his career with the most career wins (1,178) in NJCAA baseball.  180+ of his players continued their college careers elsewhere; 27 players went on to the professional ranks. Brad Pennington and Darek Braunecker are the most noteworthy; Pennington spent 6 seasons in the major leagues, while Braunecker achieved fame as a top agent for players such as Cliff Lee and A. J. Burnett;  His son Zachary plays shortstop for Southeast Missouri State.

References 

1944 births
2012 deaths
Indiana State University alumni
People from Huntingburg, Indiana
People from Dubois County, Indiana
People from Poplar Bluff, Missouri
Vincennes Trailblazers baseball coaches